The Capital Region First Ring Expressway (Formerly as Seoul Ring Expressway) (Expressway No.100) is an expressway, circular beltway or ring road around Seoul, South Korea. It connects satellite cities around Seoul, Ilsan, Namyangju, Hanam, Pyeongchon, Jungdong, Bundang, Pangyo, Sanbon and Gimpo. The expressway runs 127.6 km. Seoul Ring Expressway is currently under construction to widen the expressway between Anhyeon Junction to Seongnam which is expected to be finished in 2016.

Since 2010, Gyeonggi Loop Bus connect the many Satellite town to each other through this Expressway.

History 
 February 1988: Construction begins from Pangyo to Toegyewon.
 29 November 1991: Section from Pangyo to Toegyewon opens to traffic.
 December 1991: Construction begins from Sanbon to Pangyo.
 May 1992: Construction begins from Seoun to Jangsu.
 December 1992: Construction begins from Ilsan to Gimpo.
 June 1995: Construction begins from Gimpo to Seoun and from Jangsu to Sanbon.
 28 December 1995: Section from Pangyo to Sanbon opens to traffic.
 3 November 1997: Section from Gimpo to Jayuro opens to traffic.
 24 July 1998: Section from Seoun to Jangsu opens to traffic.
 26 November 1999: Sections from Jangsu to Sanbon and from Gimpo to Seoun open to traffic.
 11 September 2001: Section from Ilsan to Jayuro opens to traffic.
 30 June 2006: Sections from Ilsan to Songchu and from Uijeongbu to Toegyewon open to traffic.
 28 December 2007: Section from Songchu to Uijeongbu opens to traffic.
 3 May 2010: Dori JC opens to traffic.
 28 May 2015: Howon IC opens to traffic.
 Winter 2015: 확장공사
 September 1, 2020: The Seoul Ring Expressway is renamed Capital Region First Ring Expressway.

Composition

Lanes 
 Hanam JC~Gangil IC, Ilsan IC~Jayuro (Rigid Pavement) IC: 10
 Gangil JC~Ilsan IC, Jayuro IC~Hanam-Jirisan Mountain-Seongsan (Rigid Pavement) (68 km) (42.25 mi) JC: 8

Length 
 128.02 km

Limited Speed 
 100 km/h

Tunnel

List of Facilities 

IC: Interchange, JC: Junction, SA: Service Area, TG:Tollgate

See also 
 Roads and expressways in South Korea
 Transportation in South Korea

External links 
 MOLIT South Korean Government Transport Department

 
Expressways in South Korea
Gyeonggi Province
Transport in Seoul
Ring roads
Roads in Gyeonggi
Roads in Seoul
Roads in Incheon